Rydstrom, also spelt Rydström and Rydstrøm, is a surname. Notable people with the surname include:

Arthur Rydstrøm (1896–1986), Norwegian gymnast
Gary Rydstrom (born 1959), American sound designer and director
Henrik Rydström (born 1976), Swedish football manager and former player 
Nils Rydström (1921-2018), Swedish fencer
Rudolf Rydström (1886–1929), Swedish wrestler